Riviera-LM Records was a French record label.

History 
Riviera-LM was founded in 1951 by French record producer Eddie Barclay. The label produced new singers and bands. Riviera-LM production facilities in Milan produced Italian editions of foreign artists, including Nino Ferrer and Peter Holm. Riviera was distributed in Spain and Portugal.

In September 1964 Barclay and Phillipe Loury, then president of Erato Records, founded Compagnie européenne du disque (CED) to distribute records. Riviera and Erato were the first two labels used by the system.  Riviera later became Riviera-LM, run by Leo Missir.  Riviera was distributed in Spain and Portugal.

Riviera gained distribution rights for Chess, Atlantic and Stax. It compiled many recordings of these labels by initiating a system of direct imports from the US for distribution in France.

Partial sale of Disques Barclay 
On November 16, 1978, PolyGram acquired a 40% interest in Disques Barclay and Societe Generale also acquired 40%, leaving Barclay with 20% of the company.  Barclay remained president and retained operating independence in terms of artistic, commercial and distribution activity.

Sale of Disques Barclaly 
In 1979, hit by the music industry crisis, Barclay sold his company, which included the Riviera label, to Philips-owned conglomerate PolyGram. His labels survived as a unit of PolyGram and then Universal Music Group.

Selected artists 
The best-known singers who worked with the subsidiary of Barclay Records were Nino Ferrer, Guy Marchand, and Daniel Balavoine, including albums that came out under the Barclay / Riviera labels from 1978-1984. Others were Raymond Lefèvre, Jean Musy (fr), Nicoletta and Michel Orso.

Other labels named Riviera 
The Riviera of this article should not be confused with Riviera Records, an American label founded by Eddie Heller, who also founded Rainbow Records.

Selected discography

45 rpm

References 

Italian record labels
Defunct record labels of Italy
Italian independent record labels